In August 2010, Bueno ran a Chevrolet Vectra on the Bonneville Salt Flats at speeds over 340 km/h (~210 mph).

WA Mattheis was a Brazilian auto racing team based in Petropolis, Rio de Janeiro. The team won three times the Stock Car Brasil, two of those times sponsored by Red Bull. In 2013 the partnership of Andreas Mattheis and William Lube concluded. Mattheis created a new team with son Rodolfo, R. Mattheis. Lube created a new team, Voxx Racing.

References

See also
 A.Mattheis Motorsport
 R. Mattheis Motorsport

Stock Car Brasil teams
2007 establishments in Brazil
2013 disestablishments in Brazil